Madina Hospital (also known as Medina Hospital) is one of the two major hospitals in Mogadishu, Somalia.

The Medina Hospital (MH)is a dedicated medical facility that handles emergencies in Mogadishu. It focuses on trauma and emergency maternal medicine, treating several hundred war-wounded patients and expectant mothers every month. Emergency cases include among other incidents such as traffic accidents, falls from heights, explosions, weapon wounds, sharp objects injuries, person to person fights, among many others.

Always strive to internalize the vision, mission and values of the hospital

VISION: 

Medina Hospital will provide an unparalleled experience as the most trusted partner in health care to the community and deserving public in Somalia.” 

MISSION:

To be a provider of high quality patient-focused health care that is readily accessible, cost effective and meets the needs of the communities we serve.

VALUES
 
Variety
Ethical 
Respect
Service
Excellence

References

Further reading

External links 
 

Hospitals in Somalia
Buildings and structures in Mogadishu